Reinaud may refer to:

 Joseph Toussaint Reinaud (1795–1867), French orientalist
 Émile Reinaud (1854–1924), French politician
 Cécile Reinaud (born 1973), French entrepreneur

See also 
 Renaud (disambiguation)
 Reynaud (disambiguation)
 Reinoud (disambiguation)
 Reinaudi (disambiguation)